The Fokin Government was the second Cabinet of Ministers appointed in independent Ukraine (1990-1991) that was approved following the ousting of the Masol's government due to the 1990 Kyiv's student strike (also known as Revolution on Granite).

On 18 April 1991 the head of the Council of Minister of the Ukrainian SSR was officially renamed as the Prime-Minister of the Ukrainian SSR. On 21 May 1991 the former council of ministers was officially renamed as cabinet of ministers of the Ukrainian SSR. On 17 September 1991 Ukrainian SSR was officially renamed into Ukraine.

Brief scope
On June 13, 1990 Verkhovna Rada of Ukrainian SSR acknowledged through its declaration the petition of the Council of Ministers of Ukrainian SSR about its resignation because of reelections to Verkhovna Rada. The council, however was authorized to continue to perform its duties until the new government would be formed. The new chairman of the government was appointed on June 28. Initially the government was headed by Vitaliy Masol, however he was forced to resign due to heavy student's manifestations in Kyiv. In November 1990 the new chairman was appointed Vitold Fokin who replaced the acting chairman Kostyantyn Masik.

On July 16, 1990 the Verkhovna Rada adopted the Declaration of State Sovereignty of Ukraine, after which on July 18 were appointed three chairman's deputies. However, it was not until July 25 when the first members of new council were appointed. The process of confirming the ministerial positions stretched until August 3, 1990.

On April 18, 1991 the Council of Ministers was replaced with the Cabinet of Ministers. Offices of chairman and his deputies became offices of Prime Minister and his vice-ministers. There also was introduced a new special position of state minister, which however was liquidated on February 25, 1992. On February 25 the whole cabinet was reconstructed and reshuffled.

1990 Composition (Last Council of Ministers)
Initial composition

After July 25

State Committees

Changes
 On August 3, 1990 Kostyantyn Masik became the First Deputy Chairman
 On October 23, 1990 Vitaliy Masol was dismissed, while Masik was performing his duties as the First Deputy
 On November 14, 1990 Vitold Fokin was appointed the new Chairman

1990–1992 Composition (First Cabinet of Ministers)

State Committees

Changes
1991
 On September 20 KGB was liquidated, in its place was formed the Service of National Security.
 On October 23 the new Minister of Finance was appointed Hryhoriy P'yatachenko replacing Oleksandr Kovalenko.
 On October 29 Maselsky was dismissed. New vice-prime-minister was appointed on February 25, 1992 (Viktor Sytnyk).
 On December 12 the Ministry of National Education was replaced with the Ministry of Education headed by Petro Talanchuk.
 On December 31 Volodymyr Tymofeyev replaced the Minister of Trade Oleh Slepichev.
1992
 On February 25 all State Ministries were liquidated.
 On February 25 the State Ministry of Defense Complex and Conversion replaced with the Ministry of Machine-Building, Military-Industrial Complex, and Conversion.
 On February 25 the State Ministry of Investment Policy and Construction Complex replaced with the Ministry of Investments and Construction.
 On February 26 the State Secretary of Cabinet of Ministers became the Minister of Cabinet of Ministers.
 On February 29 the State Ministry of Agrarian Policy and Provision replaced with the Ministry of Farm Management and Provision.
 On February 29 the State Ministry of Industry and Transportation split between the Ministry of Industry and the Ministry of Transportation (recreated later).
 On March 5 the State Ministry of Economy replaced with the Ministry of Economy.
 On March 6 Volodymyr Lanovyi was appointed a vice-prime-minister, while holding the post of the Minister of Economy.
 On March 20 Volodymyr Kampo replaced the Minister of Justice Vitaliy Boiko.
 On March 20 Anatoliy Voronkov replaced the Minister of International Business Relationships Valeriy Kravchenko.
 On March 20 Roman Shpek replaced the Minister in Affairs of State Property Privatization and De-monopolization of Industry Viktor Salnikov.
 On July 11 Lanovyi (Minister of Economy) was dismissed.
 On July 11 Valentyn Symonenko was appointed the First vice-prime-minister.
 On September 28 Mykhailo Pavlovsky replaced the Minister of Industry Viktor Hladush.
 On October 1 Fokin was dismissed as the Verkhovna Rada expressed its doubt in government.
 On October 2 Valentyn Symonenko was appointed an acting prime-minister.
 On October 16 the Minister of Cabinet of Ministers was dismissed.
 On October 27 was approved the new Cabinet of Ministers headed by Leonid Kuchma.
 On November 7 Valentyn Symonenko was dismissed.
 On November 13 the Ministry of State Resources was liquidated.
 On November 13 the Ministry of International Business Relationships was liquidated.
 On November 13 the Ministry in Affairs of State Property Privatization and De-monopolization of Industry was liquidated.
 On December 8 the Minister of Farm Management and Provision was dismissed.
 On December 30 the Minister of Investments and Construction was dismissed.

References

Ukrainian governments
1991 establishments in Ukraine
1992 disestablishments in Ukraine
Cabinets established in 1991
Cabinets disestablished in 1992